RYN may refer to:

 Royan - Médis Aerodrome, France (by IATA code)
 Roydon railway station (by National Rail station code)
 Ryan Airfield. in Tucson, Arizona (by FAA code)
 Ryan International Airlines (by ICAO code)

See also
 Ryn (disambiguation)